American Lesion is a solo album by Greg Graffin, the lead singer of the punk band Bad Religion. Like the album Into the Unknown, this album is a massive departure for Graffin, whose songs generally revolve around loud guitars and harmonies. American Lesion for the most part features Graffin's voice alone, and each song features acoustic guitar or piano rather than electric guitars. The song "Cease" (track 6 on this album) is a slow piano ballad that is also featured on Bad Religion's album The Gray Race as a fast-paced punk rock song.

The lyrical content can also be seen as a departure for Graffin.  In most Bad Religion songs, he deals with subjects such as mass globalisation or world pollution. The songs on American Lesion are much more personal; the songs were apparently written about the breakup of his marriage, making the album poignant.

Track listing
 All songs written and composed by Greg Graffin.

"Opinion"  – 3:12
"Fate's Cruel Hand"  – 4:43
"Predicament"  – 3:11
"The Fault Line"  – 3:03
"When I Fail"  – 3:36
"Cease"  – 4:32
"Maybe She Will"  – 4:27
"The Elements"  – 3:47
"In the Mirror"  – 2:41
"Back to Earth"  – 4:08

References

1997 debut albums
Atlantic Records albums
Greg Graffin albums
Epitaph Records albums